Thee Michelle Gun Elephant (often abbreviated to TMGE) was a Japanese garage rock band formed in 1991.

History
The band was formed in 1991, while Chiba, Ueno, and Kuhara were students at Tokyo's Meiji Gakuin University. They later drew influence from The Roosters. Their unusual name originated when a friend mispronounced the title of an early jam session recording; featuring cover songs of Thee Headcoats (one of the band's main influences) and from The Damned's album Machine Gun Etiquette. Some years later Futoshi Abe joined the band. After an independently released EP in 1995, they signed to Nippon Columbia's Triad label, releasing the album Cult Grass Stars in 1996, followed later that year by High Time, the band enjoying chart success in their home country. Chicken Zombies (1997) gave them a top five hit. The band's 1998 album Gear Blues was the first to be released in the US (in 2000). A lot of their songs were also used in Blue Spring, a Japanese movie made in 2002. 

The band announced that they would break up on October 11, 2003, after their Last Heaven tour of Japan. On July 22, 2009, the guitarist Futoshi Abe died of an acute hematoma.

Song titles and lyrics
The majority of the band's songs have English titles, which often appear to be a random selection of words cobbled together - 'Pinhead Cranberry Dance', for example.

The lyrics are almost entirely Japanese, with the odd English phrase or word thrown in.

Side projects
All four members have had other musical projects or played with other bands both while in TMGE and after its break-up. Some of these are as follows:

Yusuke Chiba
 ROSSO (Vocals, Guitar and Songwriting on all releases)
 The Birthday (Vocals, Guitars and Songwriting on all releases)
 The Midwest Vikings (Vocals, Guitars and Songwriting under the alias 'LACOSTE')
 Tokyo Ska Paradise Orchestra (Vocals on one song on the album 'Stompin' On Down Beat Alley')
 Raven
 Bugy Craxone
 Midnight Bankrobbers

Kazuyuki Kuhara
 ROSSO (Drums on some live appearances)
 The Birthday (Drums on all releases)
 The Midwest Vikings (Drums and Pianica under the alias 'HANG TEN')
 Yoko Utsumi's YOKOLOCO BAND (Drums on later releases)
 Shigeki Hamabe (Drums on first two albums)
 M.J.Q (drums on all releases)

Koji Ueno
 Radio Caroline (Bass on all releases)
 The Hiatus (Bass on all releases)

Futoshi Abe (died 2009)
 KOOLOGI (Guitar on first album)
 Barebones
 Strawberry Jean (Guitar - This was Futoshi Abe's pre-TMGE band)

Discography

Albums
 Maximum! Maximum!! Maximum!!! (1993) Self-released
 Cult Grass Stars (1996) Triad
 High Time (1996) Triad
 Chicken Zombies (1997) Triad
 Gear Blues (1998) Triad
 Casanova Snake (2000) Triad
 Rodeo Tandem Beat Specter (2001) Triad
 Sabrina Heaven (2003) Island
 Sabrina No Heaven (2003) Island

Live albums
 Casanova Said "Live or Die" (2000) Triad
 Last Heaven's Bootleg (2003) Island

Singles
 Sekai no Owari (1996) Triad
 Candy House (1996) Triad
 Lily (1996) Triad
 Culture (1997) Triad
 Get Up Lucy (1997) Triad
 The Birdmen (1997) Triad
 G.W.D (1998) Triad
 Out Blues (1998) Triad
 Smokin' Billy (1998) Triad
 GT400 (2000) Triad
 Baby Stardust (2000) Triad
 Abakareta-Sekai (2001) Triad
 Taiyou wo Tsukande Shimatta (2002) Island
 Girl Friend (2003) Trippin' Elephant
 Electric Circus (2003) Island

B-sides compilations
 Rumble (1999) Triad

Best of compilations
 TMGE 106 (2000) Triad
 Collection (2001) Alive Records (US release)
 Grateful Triad Years (2002) Triad
 Thee Greatest Hits (2009) Columbia

Other releases
 Wonder Style (1995) Trippin' Elephant
 Wonder Style (reissue) (1997) Triad
 Vibe On! (1998) Trippin' Elephant
 Kwacker (with Mick Green) (2001) Trippin' Elephant

DVDs
TMGE have released a number of live and PV DVDs. A box set of some of these were due to be released by Universal in January 2010, consisting of 10 discs under the title of 'THEE LIVE'.

References

External links
 [ AllMusic.com: Biography]
 Official Site
 
 
 ミッシェル・ガン・エレファント - 日本コロムビア内の公式ページ
 THEE MICHELLE GUN ELEPHANT - ユニバーサルミュージック内の公式ページ

Japanese punk rock groups
Japanese garage rock groups
Universal Music Japan artists
Nippon Columbia artists
Alive Naturalsound Records artists
Musical groups established in 1991
Musical groups disestablished in 2003
1991 establishments in Japan
2003 disestablishments in Japan